The medieval Knepp Castle (sometimes referred to as 'Old Knepp Castle', to distinguish it from the nearby 19th-century mansion) is to the west of the village of West Grinstead, West Sussex, England near the River Adur and the A24.

The castle was probably founded by the Braose family in the 12th century. King John confiscated the castle along with the Braose lands in 1208. Knepp was used as a hunting lodge, and John visited the castle several times. He ordered its destruction in both 1215 and 1216 during the First Baron's War.

Knepp Castle continued to be used into the 14th century and hosted reigning monarchs on several occasions. The castle eventually fell out of use and by the early 18th century was mostly destroyed. Later that century, stone was the castle was used to build a nearby road.

The name is thought to come from the Old English word "cnæp", referring to the mound on which it stands. The land around the castle is now the site of Knepp Wildland.

History
Knepp was a motte castle, probably founded in the 12th century by William de Braose, in the Rape of Bramber. In 1208 King John confiscated a later William de Braose's land, including Knepp. While John's motivation is uncertain, he came to view William de Braose as a threat; in historian Sidney Painter's view the treatment of the Braose family was "the greatest mistake John made during his reign ... it made his cruelty known to all his barons", and contributed to the discontent of the barons who later revolted against John's rule.

The first surviving record of the castle is dated to 1210. Royal records document spending at the castle in the 1210s on general repairs, building a chimney, and repairing a pond or moat. John was present at Knepp Castle on 6 April 1211, as evidenced by a charter confirmed on that date. Queen Isabella also stayed at the castle for eleven days in either 1214 or 1215.

In 1215, John was at war with the barons of England. Shortly after losing control of London, John wrote to Roland Bloett on 18 May instructing him to remove whatever he could carry from Knepp and send it to Bramber Castle, and then "totally destroy" Knepp Castle. This was followed by a second order to slight the castle, given by John on 13 June 1216; on this occasion he ordered Roland Bloett to "cause the castle of Cnappe [Knepp], without delay, to be burnt and destroyed".

In addition to John the castle had a succession of royal visitors, including Henry III in 1218, Edward II in 1324 and Richard II in 1384. Simon de Montfort seized Knepp Castle from William de Braose, and later returned it. Subsequently, it fell into decline and deteriorated.

Later history 

A skirmish may have taken place near Knepp Castle during the English Civil War, referred to as the 'Battle of Knepp' by Sir Charles Burrell. The event was related by James Charles Michell, a member of the Sussex gentry, in the early 19th century as a piece of oral history handed down from his father. According to Michell a parliamentarian force defeated a royalist force on 19 July 1648. Michell also reported that a cannonball had been found near the castle, but did not state when or give a precise location. Historian Richard Symonds suggests that the event caused considerable damage to the castle and contributed to its abandonment, though the Victoria County History of Sussex notes that it is unclear when the castle was destroyed. The bulk of the castle had been pulled down by the 1720s.

Ownership of the castle was linked to the manor of Knepp. In 1788 the manor was purchased by Sir Charles Raymond, and descended through the Burrell family. Antiquarian Francis Grose visited the ruins in 1775, and wrote "so completely has been the work of demolition in the instance of this castle, that a reasonable conjecture cannot be hazarded from a view of the ruins themselves, as they then appeared, of its original form and extent". About 55 years later the Rev. Edmund Cartwright observed that the ruins had further deteriorated, with stone from the castle taken to be used in roadmaking. In the early 19th century the remnants were reinforced and fenced in by Sir Charles Burrell to protect them from further deterioration.

The name 'Knepp Castle' is also applied to the castellated Gothic Revival mansion built nearby in the early nineteenth century by Sir Charles Merrik Burrell, to the designs of John Nash, and currently the home of Sir Charles Burrell, 10th Baronet.

In 1951, the castle was designated a scheduled monument, a scheme intended to protection nationally important archaeological sites. The protected area covers the whole of the mound and a section of path leading west from the castle. The wall on top of the motte was given additional protection in 1959 when it was designated a Grade II listed building.

Layout 

The castle stands on an oval mound, modelled from a natural feature, surrounded by a ditch and ramparts. The ditch, fed from a nearby pond, formed a moat which still contained water at the beginning of the eighteenth century.

The above-ground remains of the castle consist of a single wall 11 metres high, 9.5 metres long, and 2.5 metres thick, with a doorway and another opening above it. This wall apparently  formed the north end of the west wall of a tower or keep.

Knepp Wildland

References

Bibliography

External links

 Knepp Castle Estate
 Bibliography on the Gatehouse Gazetteer

Castles in West Sussex
Ruins in West Sussex
Grade II listed buildings in West Sussex
Grade II listed castles
Archaeological sites in West Sussex
Scheduled monuments in West Sussex